Michael Hanna (born 6 June 1926), played first-class cricket for Somerset and List A and Minor Counties cricket for Wiltshire. He also played rugby union for Bath and for Somerset.

As a cricketer, Hanna was a right-handed lower-order batsman and a wicketkeeper whose opportunities to play county cricket in the 1950s were limited by the presence of Harold Stephenson in the Somerset side. Hanna played one match against Nottinghamshire at Yeovil in 1951: in a rain-affected match, Nottinghamshire made 401 for seven wickets, and Hanna did not take a catch or, when Somerset batted, score a run. His only other first-class match, three years later against Northamptonshire, was no more successful. Northamptonshire made 362 for two wickets and though Somerset avoided being beaten by an innings, the match was lost by 10 wickets. Again Hanna did not take a catch, though this time he made 4 not out in the first innings and a single in the second.

From 1957 to 1968, Hanna played Minor Counties cricket for Wiltshire, and in 1964 and 1965 he played in Gillette Cup matches for the team against first-class county sides. He scored four runs against Hampshire in 1964 and one run against Nottinghamshire in 1965, but in neither match did he take any catches or effect any stumpings.

As a rugby player, he was scrum-half for both Bath and Somerset.

In 1970, he was appointed deputy county welfare officer for Derbyshire County Council.

References

1926 births
Living people
English cricketers
English rugby union players
Rugby union players from Camberwell
Somerset cricketers
Wiltshire cricketers